Jaroslav Jirkovský (March 8, 1891 - November 2, 1971) was a Czechoslovak ice hockey player who competed in the 1924 Winter Olympics.

In 1924 he participated with the Czechoslovak team in the first Winter Olympics ice hockey tournament.

Prior to his hockey career, Jirkovský played football for Slavia Prague and Bohemia.

References

External links

Olympic ice hockey tournaments 1924  

1891 births
1971 deaths
Bohemia international footballers
Czech footballers
Czech ice hockey centres
Czechoslovak footballers
Czechoslovak ice hockey centres
HC Slavia Praha players
Ice hockey people from Prague
Ice hockey players at the 1924 Winter Olympics
Olympic ice hockey players of Czechoslovakia
SK Slavia Prague players
Footballers from Prague
People from the Kingdom of Bohemia